Pat Duncan (born April 8, 1960) is a Canadian politician from Yukon. Duncan served as leader of the Yukon Liberal Party from 1998 to 2005 and as the sixth premier of Yukon from 2000 until 2002. Duncan was the first Liberal premier of the Yukon and the first female premier in the Yukon, the second woman in Canadian history to win the premiership of a province or territory through a general election, the first to do so by defeating an incumbent premier, and the first to do so by defeating a male opponent.

Duncan was appointed to the Senate of Canada on December 12, 2018.

Life before politics
Duncan was born in Edmonton, Alberta in 1960, and moved with her family to Whitehorse, Yukon in 1964. She graduated from Carleton University with a Bachelor of Arts in political science.

Professional background
Prior to entering politics, Duncan was a small business owner. She also served as executive director of the Whitehorse Chamber of Commerce. In the mid-1980s, Duncan served as a special assistant to Progressive Conservative Deputy Prime Minister Erik Nielsen. Duncan remained in this position until Nielsen's retirement in 1987.

Yukon politics
Duncan was first elected to the Yukon Legislative Assembly in the 1996 general election. Duncan was elected as a Liberal to represent the Porter Creek South riding, a riding located in Whitehorse. In the 1996 general election, Piers McDonald (New Democratic Party) won a majority government. Duncan was one of three Liberals elected. Liberal leader at the time, Ken Taylor, was unsuccessful in winning his Mount Lorne riding.

In 1998, Duncan was elected leader of the Yukon Liberal Party. From 1998-2000, Duncan served as the Leader of the Official Opposition in the legislature. In the 2000 general election Duncan led the Yukon Liberal Party to a majority government, defeating New Democratic incumbent Piers McDonald. The Liberals were elected in 10 ridings and received 42.7% of the popular vote. Early in 2002, the Liberal majority was reduced to a minority after the defection of three Liberal MLAs, Mike McLarnon, Don Roberts and Wayne Jim. The catalyst for the defections was reported to be Duncan's allegedly heavy-handed and secretive leadership style.

On October 4, 2002, only two years into Duncan's five-year term, she called a general election for November 4, 2002. The rationale for the election was to achieve certainty in the legislature, however many Yukoners were angered at the quick election. The Yukon Liberals were reduced to only one seat after the election - Duncan's own riding of Porter Creek South. Yukon Party leader Dennis Fentie, a former NDP MLA, led his new party to victory. The Liberals were reduced to third party status with Duncan as the sole Liberal MLA.

At the 2005 Yukon Liberal Party leadership convention, Duncan was defeated by Arthur Mitchell by a margin of 357 votes to 303. Citing health concerns, she did not seek re-election in the 2006 general election.

Electoral record

Yukon general election, 2002

 
| style="width: 130px" |Liberal
|Pat Duncan
|align="right"|408
|align="right"|51.7%
|align="right"|-12.5%

|NDP
|Paul Warner
|align="right"|80
|align="right"|10.1%
|align="right"|-0.7%
|- bgcolor="white"
!align="left" colspan=3|Total
!align="right"|789
!align="right"|100.0%
!align="right"|–

Yukon general election, 2000

|-
 
| style="width: 130px" |Liberal
|Pat Duncan
|align="right"|607
|align="right"|64.2%
|align="right"|+21.3%

|NDP
|Mark Dupuis
|align="right"|103
|align="right"|10.8%
|align="right"|-7.0%
|- bgcolor="white"
!align="left" colspan=3|Total
!align="right"|945
!align="right"|100.0%
!align="right"|–

Yukon general election, 1996

|-
 
| style="width: 130px" |Liberal
|Pat Duncan
|align="right"|435
|align="right"|42.9%
|align="right"|+15.0%

|NDP
|Mark Dupuis
|align="right"|181
|align="right"|17.8%
|align="right"|-7.8%
|- bgcolor="white"
!align="left" colspan=3|Total
!align="right"|1013
!align="right"|100.0%
!align="right"|–

References

Yukon Liberal Party MLAs
Premiers of Yukon
1960 births
Living people
Women MLAs in Yukon
University of Ottawa alumni
Canadian female first ministers
Politicians from Whitehorse
Politicians from Edmonton
Yukon Liberal Party leaders
Members of the Executive Council of Yukon
Women members of the Senate of Canada
20th-century Canadian politicians
21st-century Canadian politicians
Independent Canadian senators
Canadian senators from Yukon
20th-century Canadian women politicians
21st-century Canadian women politicians